Stanley Clements (born Stanislaw Klimowicz; July 16, 1926 – October 16, 1981) was an American actor and comedian, best known for portraying "Stash" in the East Side Kids film series, and group leader Stanislaus "Duke" Coveleskie in The Bowery Boys film series.

Life and career
Stanley Clements was born in Long Island, New York. Young "Stosh" (the Polish diminutive nickname for "Stanislau") realized that he wanted a show-business career while he was in grammar school, and after he graduated from Brooklyn's P.S. 49 in 1938, for the next two years he toured in vaudeville and found work in radio. He then joined the touring company of the Major Bowes Amateur Hour. His career stalled in 1940, and Clements was reduced to panhandling for a time to survive. In 1941, he was signed to a contract by 20th Century-Fox and appeared in juvenile/teen roles in several B films for the studio.

East Side Kids
In 1942 he was loaned to Monogram Pictures. Among his friends he was known offscreen as "Stosh," so he adopted the nickname "Stash" in the ensemble-cast film series, the East Side Kids.  He appeared as an East Side Kid in Smart Alecks, 'Neath Brooklyn Bridge, and Ghosts on the Loose.  He retained the character name of "Stash" in other films: Right to the Heart, Military Academy with That Tenth Avenue Gang, and Boots Malone.

Marriage
In August 1945, Clements married actress Gloria Grahame, who played bad girl Violet Bick in It's a Wonderful Life, and who later won a Best Supporting Actress Oscar for The Bad and The Beautiful. The marriage was a stormy one, with Grahame objecting to Clements's drinking and gambling, and Clements being jealous of her dalliances with other men, and it ended in 1948. He married Maria Walek in 1951. In 1964 they adopted her eight-year-old nephew, Sylvester, bringing him to the United States from Poland.

Other roles
After the East Side Kids, Clements then set out on his own again, this time landing roles in more prestigious pictures. He was featured in perhaps his best-known role as teenage street-tough-turned-choirboy "Tony Scaponi" in the 1944 Bing Crosby hit Going My Way, and scored a great success as a jockey in the 1945 Alan Ladd feature Salty O'Rourke.

Clements's acting career was interrupted by U.S. Army service as a private first class just after World War II. When he returned in 1947, he began appearing in more adult roles in lower-budgeted films, including Johnny Holiday (cast against type as a psychopath) and Destination Murder (as a hired killer). He starred in a series of action/detective pictures at the successor to Monogram Pictures, Allied Artists, for producer Ben Schwalb and director Edward Bernds.

The Bowery Boys
In 1945 after Leo Gorcey left the East Side Kids in a salary dispute with producer Sam Katzman, Gorcey's teammate Bobby Jordan arranged a meeting with his agent, Jan Grippo. Gorcey partnered with Grippo to produce a new "gang" series called The Bowery Boys, with Gorcey owning a 40% share in the franchise. Gorcey's real-life father Bernard Gorcey was added to the cast as Louie Dumbrowski, proprietor of Louie's Sweet Shop, the headquarters of The Bowery Boys. Younger brother David Gorcey, formerly one of the East Side Kids, returned to appear in the new series. 

After Bernard Gorcey was killed in an auto accident in 1955, a grief-stricken Leo Gorcey turned to alcohol for solace and became a disruptive presence in the studio during the filming of Crashing Las Vegas, trashing scenery and destroying props. In 1956 Gorcey demanded a larger share of ownership from Allied Artists, which was denied, and after a heated conversation, Gorcey stormed off the studio lot and quit the series.

When the series's then-producer Ben Schwalb needed a replacement for Gorcey, he asked Stanley Clements to step in as The Bowery Boys' new ringleader, Stanislaus "Duke" Coveleskie (although Huntz Hall received top billing). Clements comfortably settled into the role of Huntz Hall's sidekick, and co-starred in the final seven Bowery Boys comedies, beginning with Fighting Trouble.

Later career and death
Following the end of The Bowery Boys franchise in 1958, Clements went on to a steady career of supporting roles in film and television. Clements co-wrote the film The Devil's Partner (1958, not released until 1961). In 1960 Clements appeared as Clyde Simpson in the TV western Tales of Wells Fargo starring Dale Robertson in the episode "Doc Dawson." He appeared in a 1962 episode, "The Craziest Race in Town," of the adventure drama series Straightaway.  Clements also appeared in an episode of Gomer Pyle USMC entitled "Sergeant of The Guard" aired April 2, 1965.  And perhaps an example of one of his strangest acting assignments was the role of McInnery, a buffalo hunter who slept throughout the Gunsmoke episode, “The Mark of Cain”, televised in February 1969. One of his last jobs was an appearance in a nationally advertised commercial for Pringle's potato chips.

On October 16, 1981, Stanley Clements died at age 55 from emphysema in Pasadena, California, 11 days after the passing of his first wife Gloria Grahame. He is buried at Riverside National Cemetery in Riverside, California.

Films

Tall, Dark and Handsome (1941) - Detroit Harry Morrison Jr.
Accent on Love (1941) - Patrick Henry Lombroso
Down in San Diego (1941) - Louie Schwartz
I Wake Up Screaming (1941) - Newsboy (uncredited)
Right to the Heart (1942) - Stash
On the Sunny Side (1942) - Tom Sanders
Smart Alecks* (1942) - Stash
'Neath Brooklyn Bridge* (1942) - Stash
They Got Me Covered (1943) - Office Boy (uncredited)
The More the Merrier (1943) - Morton Rodakiewicz
Ghosts on the Loose* (1943) - Stash
Thank Your Lucky Stars (1943) - Boy (uncredited)
Sweet Rosie O'Grady (1943) - Danny (uncredited)
You're a Lucky Fellow, Mr. Smith (1943) - Alexander Archibald "Squirt" O'Reilly
Cover Girl (1944) - Elevator Boy (uncredited)
The Girl in the Case (1944) - Tuffy
Going My Way (1944) - Tony Scaponi (uncredited)
See My Lawyer (1945) - Willie
Salty O'Rourke (1945) - Johnny Cates
Variety Girl (1947) - Stanley Clements (uncredited)
Big Town Scandal (1948) - Tommy Malone
Hazard (1948) - Joe Zinkle, Bellhop
Canon City (1948) - New
The Babe Ruth Story (1948) - Western Union Boy
Joe Palooka in Winner Take All (1948) - Tommy Malone
Racing Luck (1948) - Boots Warren
Bad Boy (1949) - Bitsy Johnson
Mr. Soft Touch (1949) - Yonzi
Red Light (1949) - Bellboy
Johnny Holiday (1949) - Eddie Duggan
Military Academy with That Tenth Avenue Gang (1950) - Stash Martin
Destination Murder (1950) - Jackie Wales
Pride of Maryland (1951) - Frankie Longworth
Boots Malone (1952) - Stash Clements
Jet Job (1952) - Joe Kovak
Army Bound (1952) - Frank Cermak
Off Limits (1952) - Bullets Bradley
White Lightning (1953) - Mike Connors
Hot News (1953) - Mark Miller - Reporter
The Rocket Man (1954) - Bob
Air Strike (1955) - G.H. Alexander
Mad at the World (1955) - Marty aka Ignatz
Robbers' Roost (1955) - Chuck
Wiretapper (1955) - Tony
Last of the Desperados (1955) - Bert McGuire
Fighting Trouble* (1956) - Stanislaus "Duke" Coveleskie
Death of a Scoundrel (1956) - Taxi Driver (uncredited)
Hot Shots* (1956) - Stanislaus "Duke" Coveleskie
Hold That Hypnotist* (1957) - Stanislaus "Duke" Coveleskie
Spook Chasers* (1957) - Stanislaus "Duke" Coveleskie
Looking for Danger* (1957) - Stanislaus "Duke" Coveleskie
Up in Smoke* (1957) - Stanislaus "Duke" Coveleskie
Official Detective (1957, TV Series) - Rudy Armstrong
In the Money* (1958) - Stanislaus "Duke" Coveleskie
A Nice Little Bank That Should Be Robbed (1958) - Fitz
Sniper's Ridge (1961) - Cpl. Pumphrey
Saintly Sinners (1962) - Slim
Devil's Partner (1962, screenwriter)
Tammy and the Doctor (1963) - Wally Day
It's a Mad, Mad, Mad, Mad World (1963) - local reporter at police station (uncredited)
Panic in the City (1968) - Albert
The Timber Tramps (1975)
Hot Lead and Cold Feet (1978) - Saloon Man 2 (final film role)

 - East Side Kids or Bowery Boys series

Television

External links

 
 

1926 births
1981 deaths
American male film actors
Burials at Riverside National Cemetery
Deaths from emphysema
Vaudeville performers
20th Century Studios contract players
20th-century American male actors
United States Army soldiers